Richard Francis (1827 - November 30, 1888) was a famous Black bartender in pre-Prohibition Washington, D.C. Francis was born in 1827 to free Black parents in Surry County, Virginia. By 1848 he was in Washington, D.C., where he worked at Hancock's bar on 12th and Pennsylvania Avenue for almost four decades. He was a friend and confidant to a wide range of Washington politicians, including reportedly Clay, Calhoun, and Webster.  In 1884, his friend, Senator George F. Edmunds, who was at that time President pro tempore of the Senate, gave him the patronage role of managing the private restaurant and bar that then existed in the U.S. Senate.  Cocktail historian Dave Wondrich reports that, while the record is fragmentary, the first Black bartender for Congress was an individual by the name of Carter in the 1830s to 1850s, and Francis is believed to be the second Black bar manager for Congress.

He died in 1888 a wealthy man due to his investments in DC real estate; his son, Dr. John R. Francis, later purchased Hancock's bar.

He died of a paralytic stroke at home the morning of November 30, 1888 at the age of 62.

References 

1827 births
1888 deaths
People from Surry County, Virginia
People from Washington, D.C.
American bartenders